The William Lanier Hunt Arboretum (over 100 acres) is an arboretum and natural area that forms part of the North Carolina Botanical Garden. It is operated by the University of North Carolina at Chapel Hill, Old Mason Farm Road, Chapel Hill, North Carolina. The arboretum is private and not open to the public.  Arboretum property was donated by William Lanier Hunt between the 1960s and the 1990s in order to protect natural areas and conserve woody plants of the southeastern United States. It includes several rhododendron bluffs in a gorge along Morgan Creek.

External links
Other Natural Areas Managed by the North Carolina Botanical Garden
 Collectors of the UNC Herbarium: William Lanier Hunt (22 May 1906 -- 19 October 1996)

See also 
 List of botanical gardens in the United States

Hunt Arboretum
Hunt Arboretum
University of North Carolina at Chapel Hill landmarks
Protected areas of Orange County, North Carolina
University of North Carolina at Chapel Hill buildings